Gilberto dos Santos (born 27 August 1975), or simply Gilberto, is a former footballer who played as a striker. Born in Brazil, Gilberto is of Lebanese descent; he represented Lebanon internationally at the 2000 AFC Asian Cup.

Club career
Gilberto played for Akhaa Ahli Aley between 2000 and 2002, before signing for Nejmeh on 10 November 2002, scoring 31 goals for them.

On 5 November 2007, the Brazilian Football Confederation reported in its annual report of international transfers that Gilberto had transferred from Chapecoense to Maltese side Msida Saint-Joseph.

International career
Gilberto represented the Lebanon national football team at the 2000 AFC Asian Cup, playing in all three games, and in the World Cup 2002 Qualifying.

Career statistics

International

See also
 List of Lebanon international footballers born outside Lebanon

References

External links 
 
 

1975 births
Living people
Footballers from Curitiba
Brazilian people of Lebanese descent
Brazilian emigrants to Lebanon
Sportspeople of Lebanese descent
Citizens of Lebanon through descent
Brazilian footballers
Lebanese footballers
Association football forwards
Lebanese Premier League players
Akhaa Ahli Aley FC players
Nejmeh SC players
Lebanese expatriate footballers
Brazilian expatriate footballers
Expatriate footballers in Malta
Lebanese expatriate sportspeople in Malta
Brazilian expatriate sportspeople in Malta
Msida Saint-Joseph F.C. players
Associação Chapecoense de Futebol players
Lebanon international footballers
2000 AFC Asian Cup players